Pachyosa is a genus of longhorn beetles of the subfamily Lamiinae, containing the following species:

 Pachyosa atronotata (Kusama & Irie, 1976)
 Pachyosa cervinopicta Fairmaire, 1897
 Pachyosa guanyin Yamasako & Chou, 2014
 Pachyosa hirtiventris (Gressitt, 1937)
 Pachyosa itoi (Ohbayashi, 1985)
 Pachyosa kojimai (Hayashi, 1974)

References

Mesosini